Héctor Zumbado Argueta (19 March 1932 – 6 June 2016), also known as H. Zumbado, was a Cuban writer, journalist, critic, humorist, and essayist. In his words, "humor is a weapon, because it criticizes and exposes at the same time, and does so with a smile. Then that who is targeted cannot get too angry."

He has published: Limonada (Lemonade), 1978; Amor a primer añejo, 1980; Riflexiones (a portmanteau word that could be translated as Riflections), 1980; Prosas en ajiaco (Proses on pottage), 1984; El American Way (The American Way), 1981; ¡Esto le zumba!, 1981; and Kitsch, Kitsch, ¡BANG, BANG!, 1988. He has written for several Cuban and foreign press publications, like Juventud Rebelde and the magazine Bohemia.

Zumbado has collaborated with publications of Chile, Uruguay, Dominican Republic, Algeria, India, Norway, and the former GDR (German Democratic Republic), among others (3).

In 2000, he was the first person to be awarded the Cuban National Humor Award (Premio Nacional de Humorismo) (3).

As a social manners critic, his favorite subject is bureaucracy.

Biography

Héctor Zumbado was born in the zone of Vedado, at Havana, Cuba, in 1932. His mother was born in Nicaragua, and his father was from Costa Rica. They met in Madrid, and married in New York City. In the decade of the 1930s, his father, who worked for a transnational company, was moved to the company's office in Havana (Prosas en ajiaco, p. 236).

From 1948 to 1950, Zumbado resided in the United States (3) where he studied for the bachelor degree in the early 1950s. During that time, he wrote some works for a publication in English language. He took a commercial career at a university in Kentucky, which he left unfinished, because of, as he stated, hating numbers (Prosas en ajiaco, p. 236).

H. Zumbado's life as a worker started in Venezuela, where he worked as a commercial translator, money collector in a navigation company, and salesman (Prosas en ajiaco, p. 234). In Caracas, Venezuela, he tried to become a bullfighter, though he did not pass beyond "the phase of the wooden bull, with a real head and wheels" (Prosas en ajiaco, p. 234).

He went to Haiti, in 1953 (3) and worked as an auditor for the electric company at Port-au-Prince. In his own words: "they were looking for a young person who could speak French and knew about accounting and I took the chance, though the one thing I had to fulfill the requirements was my youth, since I had no knowledge of French or accounting." (Prosas en ajiaco, p. 235).

From 1953 to 1956 (3), Zumbado worked at a North American Insurance company, as an archivist, and was fired after straying the policy of a Gómez Mena family aristocrat's jewels (Prosas en ajiaco, p. 235). He has also worked as an office systems seller (Prosas en Ajiaco, p. 235).

Zumbado worked in Cuba mixing products in a laboratory, of the brand GRAVI, where they made deodorants. As he said: "I went out so clean and fragant every day, that I didn't need to take a bath, I looked like a baby." (Prosas en ajiaco, p. 235).

Between 1956 and 1961 he was a writer of publicity texts for tourism agencies (3). That was his job by 1959 with the advent of the Cuban Revolution. In 1961 he was appointed as a publicity chief at INIT (Prosas en ajiaco, p. 236), and then worked as a researcher of the demand, in a research department of the Ministry of Industries, until 1963 (3), when, he would start doing the same work for the Ministry of the Food Industry. That was up to 1967, when he moved to Juventud Rebelde.

In 1963 he wrote several stories for the magazine Bohemia, which was his initiation in literature. Between that year and 1967 he published about fifteen stories, in a humorous style and mood. Due to this, he was asked to work with La Chicharra, a humor publication of Juventud Rebelde. He accepted because, as he states, he wished to work as a writer (Prosas en ajiaco, p. 248). In La Chicharra he wrote the section Limonada (Lemonade), that would later be published in the newspaper on Sundays, between 1969 and 1970, to be compiled later in a book in 1978.

From Juventud Rebelde, he went to work at Prensa Latina, where he wrote an international section, that was released in about fifteen countries, under the title El American Way, satirizing the North American way of life.

Later on, between 1971 and 1973, Zumbado was a chief editor at the magazine Cuba, and at La hiena triste (The sad hyena), a publication of the UNEAC (Union of Artists and Writers of Cuba) (3). Then he worked for the Institute of the Domestic Demand as an exportable funds publicity and promotion adviser of the integral promotion group (EMPI), where he worked together with his wife, Mabel (Prosas en ajiaco, p. 236).

Between 1986 and 1988 H. Zumbado worked as chief of the humor page of Bohemia, and had some collaborations, in 1987, with the Cuban radio station Radio Rebelde (3). In 1988, he started working as chief editor of the Cuban tourism magazine Sol y Son.

In the year 2000, H. Zumbado was awarded the National Humor Award (Premio Nacional de Humorismo) of Cuba. Zumbado was the first to be given the award, since that was its first edition (3).

Zumbado has been awarded the medal Raúl Gómez García, and the class of the National Culture (3). He has two sons and two daughters, from oldest to youngest: Héctor, Karla, Yamil, and Teriana (Prosas en ajiaco, pp. 235–236).

Literary work

Limonada

Limonada (Lemonade, in English) is a series of short articles of manners, written by H. Zumbado for the Cuban newspaper Juventud Rebelde. There were about forty published from May 1969 to March 1971, mostly on Sundays. (Limonada, p. 9).

Commenting on the purpose of the work, the author states:
"I think that, generally speaking, Limonada attempts to criticize some habits, especially of some deficiencies in temperament, character, and personality; of some negative attitudes and other vices inherited since the times of Cristopher Columbus (...), that represented the tiny thing of 466 years, 2 months, and three days, influencing every day the Cuban idiosyncrasy, and, as it is to expect, were not to be eradicated in only twenty years of a new and higher way of being. On the other hand, Limonada attempts as well to catch some general traits of our peculiar psychology, including its positive facets." (Limonada, p. 9).

About the title, H. Zumbado asserts: "This section was called this way because it was intended to be something fresh and that's all the truth and not as some claim -including my wife- that the title is as well due to the acid in the lemon." (Limonada, pp. 8–9).

The articles were compiled in the book Limonada, published in 1978, by the editorial Letras Cubanas.

The book featured a "Prilogue", which, in the author's words, is a hybrid of a prologue and an epilogue; to help with readers who would read the prologue after reading the rest of the book, or the epilogue before; and helps with writers and critics who would write a good epilogue for a prologue, and vice versa. This "prilogue" was written by Héctor Zumbado himself.

The illustrations in the book were made by Jorge Hernández, and the cover of the book was made by Guerrero.

The book has thirty-eight short stories, grouped in four sections. The grouping in three sections was done for the book, and not for the original articles or their publication.

Riflexiones

Riflexiones is a series of articles written by H. Zumbado, and published weekly, on Sundays,  in the newspaper Juventud Rebelde. In the author's words: "Riflexiones is just an attempt of synthesis of what people say" (Prosas en ajiaco, p. 238).  While Limonada is more about personal traits in the society of the time, Riflexiones is rather about attitudes, methods, and situations (Prosas en ajiaco, p. 245).

One of the best virtues of these Riflexiones of Zumbado are that they are legible, understandable by every kind of readers, with any cultural level, but without easy concessions. He does not hesitate, indeed, in using plenty and in a very smart way, the literary, historical, or philosophical citations; but without resulting in a dark text for those readers who do not know the references .

Riflexiones was published as a book in 1980.

The term riflexión is a portmanteau word, merging rifle (Spanish for rifle) and reflexión (Spanish for reflexion, meditation). Therefore, riflexión could be translated as riflection. The term riflexiones is its plural form. As a verb, it is riflexionar, which could be translated as to riflect. In H. Zumbado's own words: "I thought of name of the section as a word play that combines thinking, reflecting, and the concept of critics, a kind of focusing and aiming." (Prosas en ajiaco, p. 237).

¡Esto le zumba!

The book ¡Esto le zumba! was published in 1981. The content of the book is twenty-five short stories.

The stories are full of sharp criticism about social aberrations and Cuban manners; with a spontaneous, sarcastic, and funny style (¡Esto le zumba!).

According to the author, the book is about all the stories that he had written in the last twenty years; from El hombre del teléfono (The man of the phone), written in February, 1963, to La croqueta (The croquette), written in early March, 1981 (¡Esto le zumba!, p. 7).

References

 
 
 
 

1932 births
People from Havana
2016 deaths
Cuban male short story writers
Cuban short story writers
Cuban male writers